Misener is a surname. Notable people with the surname include:

Zeola Hershey Misener (1878–1966), American suffragist and one of the first women elected to the Indiana General Assembly
Dorothy Misener Jurney (1909–2002), American journalist
Jim Misener (born 1956), Canadian ice hockey player